Chastain is an American heavy metal music band, formed in 1984 by guitarist David T. Chastain and signed by Shrapnel Records.

Career 
The band was put together in 1984 by Mike Varney, president of Shrapnel for a David T. Chastain solo album. Varney had noticed the shred guitar ability of Chastain, member of the Cincinnati-based band CJSS and, at the same time, he wanted to create an output for the talent of young singer Leather Leone, formerly with the San Francisco band Rude Girl. The first band lineup included Leone, Chastain, CJSS bassist Mike Skimmerhorn and drummer Fred Coury, who later played in Cinderella. In 1986, Chastain readily declared that "I could never work with these people on a full-time basis because they live all over the country (...). We just get together once a year, record an album and then go off and do our own things". In the case of Chastain, he wrote music for CJSS and his solo albums, as well as producing other artists and managing his own record label.

Their debut album Mystery of Illusion was released worldwide in 1985, followed by Ruler of the Wasteland (1986), both through Shrapnel, and The 7th of Never (1987) through David Chastain's own label Leviathan Records. Drummer Ken Mary (Fifth Angel, TKO, Flotsam and Jetsam (band)) replaced Coury from 1986 to 1988. The fourth album The Voice of the Cult was released in 1988. On 1990s For Those Who Dare, new virtuoso bass player David Harbour replaced Skimmerhorn and drummer John Luke Hebert replaced Mary, who went to play for Alice Cooper. Having put on hiatus CJSS to favor the more commercially successful Chastain, the band became also David T. Chastain main touring occupation, with a succession of world tours until 1991.

After some years of quiescence, when David T. Chastain dedicated his time to other solo projects, in 1995 appeared Sick Society and in 1997 In Dementia, which were recorded with a new cast: Kate French on vocals, Kevin Kekes on bass and former Trouble member Dennis Lesh on drums.

Until the appearance of the 2004 album, In an Outrage the band disappeared again. The lineup for this album, in addition to David Chastain and singer Kate French, saw also her husband, Larry Howe and Dave Starr (both ex-Vicious Rumors) on board.

Chastain reformed with original vocalist Leather Leone, Mike Skimmerhorn and drummer Stian Kristoffersen (Pagan's Mind) to release "Surrender to No One" in 2013 and "We Bleed Metal" in 2015. Leather continues to tour under her own name performing classic and new Chastain tracks.

Lineup

Current members 
 Leather Leone – vocals (1984–1992, 2013–present)
 David T. Chastain – guitar, keyboards (1984–present)
 Mike Skimmerhorn – bass (1984–1989, 2013–present)
 Stian Kristoffersen – drums (2013–present)

Past members 
  Kate French – vocals (1995–2005), bass (1995–1997)
 David Harbour – bass (1989–1992)
 Kevin Kekes – bass (1997–1998)
 Dave Starr – bass (2001–2005)
 Fred Coury – drums (1984–1986)
 Ken Mary – drums (1986–1990)
 John Luke Hebert – drums (1990–1992)
 Dennis Lesh – drums (1995–1998)
 Larry Howe – drums (2001–2005)

Timeline

Discography 
 Mystery of Illusion (1985)
 Ruler of the Wasteland (1986)
 The 7th of Never (1987)
 The Voice of the Cult (1988)
 For Those Who Dare (1990)
 Sick Society (1995)
 In Dementia (1997)
 In an Outrage (2004)
 The Reign of Leather (2010)
 Surrender to No One(2013)
 We Bleed Metal (2015)
 Chastainium (2017)

See also 
Shock Waves (1989) Leather Leone album

References

External links 

David T. Chastain official site
Leviathan Records official site
Shrapnel Records official site

Musical groups established in 1984
Heavy metal musical groups from Ohio
American power metal musical groups
Shrapnel Records artists